Luticola desmetii is a species of non-marine diatom first found in lakes of James Ross Island.

References

Further reading
Vignoni, Paula A., et al. "Hydrochemical, sedimentological, biological and magnetic characterization of lakes in James Ross Archipelago, Antarctica."
Kopalová, Kateřina, et al. "Diversity, ecology and biogeography of the freshwater diatom communities from Ulu Peninsula (James Ross Island, NE Antarctic Peninsula)." Polar Biology 36.7 (2013): 933-948.

External links
AlgaeBase

Naviculales